Snow Dragon is a 2013 Czech television film directed by Eugen Sokolovský. It premiered on 25 December 2013. It was viewed by 700,000 people. It is a fantasy, action film.

Plot
The film tells story of Princess Laura and Prince Jan. It was prophesied that Jan will make Laura unhappy and Queen Vilma cast a curse upon him. Jan turns into a Snow dragon every night. Vilma then leaves Laura and her husband Valentin. When Laura grows up and has to choose her husband she meets Jan and they fall in love. King disagrees and wants to prevent it. They escape and princes finds out about the curse. They set of to remove it from him. It is revealed during the journey that Jan is coward and is unable to help Laura when she is in danger. It eventually leads to conflict between them and Laura returns home. She is set to marry evil Dacián but Jan finds courage to face him and Dacián turns into a black dragon. Jan fights him in is Snow dragon form and wins. The curse is removed and Jan marries Laura.

Cast
 Petr Lněnička (date of birth: 20.07.1979, place of birth: Litomysl, Czechoslovakia) as Prince Jan
 Petra Tenorová (date of birth: 20.02.1989, place of birth: Praha, Czechoslovakia) as Princess Laura
 Martin Mysicka as Prince Dacián
 Saša Rašilov as King Valentin
 Jitka Cvancarová as Queen Vilma
 Arnost Goldflam as Hubert

Reception
The film has won an award at Zlín film festival for children.

References

External links
 
 Official website

2013 television films
2013 films
2010s monster movies
2010s Czech-language films
Czech action films
Czech fantasy films
Czech children's films
Films about dragons
Czech television films
Czech Television original films
Czech monster movies